The 2015 Aviva Tour of Britain was an eight-stage men's professional road cycling race. It was the twelfth running of the 2004 incarnation of the Tour of Britain and the 76th British tour in total. The race started on 6 September in Beaumaris and finished on 13 September in London. The race was part of the 2015 UCI Europe Tour.

Teams
The twenty teams invited to participate in the Tour of Britain are:

Stages

Stage 1
6 September 2015 — Beaumaris to Wrexham,

Stage 2
7 September 2015 — Clitheroe to Colne,

Stage 3
8 September 2015 — Cockermouth to Floors Castle,

Stage 4
9 September 2015 — Edinburgh to Blyth,

Stage 5
10 September 2015 — Prudhoe to Hartside Fell, Cumbria,

Stage 6
11 September 2015 — Stoke-on-Trent to Nottingham,

Stage 7
12 September 2015 — Fakenham to Ipswich,

Stage 8
13 September 2015 — London,

Classification leadership

Standings

General classification

Points classification

Mountains classification

Sprints classification

Team classification

References

External links

2015
Tour of Britain
Tour of Britain
Tour of Britain